Paul Cory Staake (December 26, 1898 – April 7, 1971) was an American football coach and college administrator.  He was the head football coach at Kalamazoo College in Kalamazoo, Michigan.  He held that position for the 1918 season.  His coaching record at Kalamazoo was 1–2.

Staake also played college football at Kalamazoo.  He later served as president of Webber College in Babson Park, Florida.

References

1898 births
1971 deaths
American football halfbacks
Heads of universities and colleges in the United States
Kalamazoo Hornets football coaches
Kalamazoo Hornets football players
People from Allegan County, Michigan
Sportspeople from Kalamazoo, Michigan
Players of American football from Michigan
20th-century American academics